Valerie Sterk Kemper (born December 4, 1975) is a retired American female volleyball player. She was part of the United States women's national volleyball team at the 1998 FIVB Volleyball Women's World Championship in Japan.

References

External links
Article title
http://www.msuspartans.com/sports/w-volley/spec-rel/072307aaa.html
http://www.msuspartans.com/genrel/090707aad.html
http://articles.orlandosentinel.com/2012-07-04/sports/os-meet-hunter-kemper-box-20120704_1_international-triathlon-union-world-usa-triathlon-elite-triathlete

1975 births
Living people
American women's volleyball players
Place of birth missing (living people)
21st-century American women
Michigan State Spartans women's volleyball players